Neal Gregory Marshall (born June 13, 1969 in Victoria, British Columbia) is a Canadian speed skater. For the 1994-1995 season he was the winner at Speed Skating World Cup's 1500 m division. In 1997, he took bronze at the World Single Distance Championships for Men in the 1,500 m division. From March 16 to November 29, 1997 he held the world record for the 1,500 meter.

World record 

Source: SpeedSkatingStats.com

References 

 Neal Marshall at SpeedSkatingStats.com
Sports-Reference

Olympic speed skaters of Canada
Sportspeople from Victoria, British Columbia
Speed skaters at the 1992 Winter Olympics
Speed skaters at the 1994 Winter Olympics
Speed skaters at the 1998 Winter Olympics
1969 births
Living people
World record setters in speed skating